Fremont Township is one of twelve townships in Steuben County, Indiana, United States. As of the 2010 census, its population was 2,993 and it contained 1,224 housing units.

Geography
Lakes in this township include Eaton Lake, Fish Lake and Walters Lake.

Cities and towns
 Fremont

Cemeteries
The township contains four cemeteries: Bower, Coventer (also known as Ray Cemetery), Lakeside, and Fremont Cemetery (listed by the USGS as "The Old Cemetery").

Major highways
  Interstate 80
  Indiana State Road 120
  Indiana State Road 827

Education
Fremont Township residents may obtain a free library card from the Fremont Public Library.

References
 
"Steuben County Cemeteries", Steuben County, Indiana, INGenWeb Site, accessed August 12, 2008.
 United States Census Bureau cartographic boundary files

External links
 Indiana Township Association
 United Township Association of Indiana

Townships in Steuben County, Indiana
Townships in Indiana